Bliszczyce  (or Blížčice) is a village in the administrative district of Gmina Branice, within Głubczyce County, Opole Voivodeship, in south-western Poland, close to the Czech border.

In the village is a hill Barania Kopa (411.3 metres, Czeska Górka too) and this hill is one of several stops tourist route of Bronisław Juzwiszyn.

Natives 
 Alfons Tracki (1896–1946) – German priest in Albania

References

Bliszczyce